Mark A. Radcliffe (born June 20, 1971) is an American Democratic politician and lawyer. Radcliffe serves in the Wisconsin State Assembly, representing the 92nd Assembly District since his election in 2008.

Biography
Born in Madison, Wisconsin, Radcliffe graduated from Black River Falls High School. Radcliffe received his bachelor's degree from University of Wisconsin–Stevens Point and his J.D. degree from Hamline University Law School.

In April 2012, Radcliffe announced he would not seek reelection to the Wisconsin State Assembly.

He has been village attorney in Alma Center, Wisconsin since 1999.

Notes

External links
 
Follow the Money - Mark Radcliffe
2008 campaign contributions
Mark Radcliffe campaign contributions at Wisconsin Democracy Campaign

1971 births
Living people
Politicians from Madison, Wisconsin
People from Alma Center, Wisconsin
University of Wisconsin–Stevens Point alumni
Hamline University School of Law alumni
Wisconsin lawyers
21st-century American politicians
Lawyers from Madison, Wisconsin
Democratic Party members of the Wisconsin State Assembly